This is an alphabetized list of notable accordionists who have their own main articles or belong to a notable band.

A
 Benny Andersson (born 1946) – Swedish songwriter, member of best-selling pop group ABBA
 Lydie Auvray (born 1956) – French/German accordionist, composer
 Slavko Avsenik (1929–2015) – Slovenian songwriter, the founder of Ansambel bratov Avsenik
Ramon Ayala (born 1945) – Mexican accordionist, composer
Nick Ariondo (born 1949) – American accordionist, composer

B
 Alan Bern (born 1955) – member of the Klezmer band Brave Old World
 Bratko Bibič (born 1957) – Slovene accordionist
 Renato Borghetti (born 1963) – Brazilian musician
 Franko Božac (born 1974) – Croatian classical and concert accordionist
 Smiley Burnette (1911–1967) – American accordionist
 Gary Blair (born 1945) - Scottish Accordionist Classical, Folk, Continental

C
 Manuela Josefa Cabrera (born 1943) - known as Fefita la Grande, Dominican merengue accordionist
 Carmen Carrozza (1921–2013) – classical and concert accordionist
 Nico Carstens (1926–2016) – South African accordionist and songwriter, composer of the hit song "Zambezi"
 Boozoo Chavis (1930–2001) – American zydeco musician
 Clifton Chenier (1925–1987) – American zydeco musician
 Dick Contino (1930–2017) – appeared on The Ed Sullivan Show a record 48 times
 Gianni Coscia (born 1931) – jazz accordionist
 Charles Thomas Cozens (born 1952) – Canadian classical and classical crossover accordionist
 James Crabb (born 1967) – Scottish classical accordion player.
 Phil Cunningham (born 1974) – Scottish folk accordionist
 Andy Cutting (born 1969) – English folk accordionist

D
 Jackie Daly (born 1945) – Irish traditional musician
 Robert Davine (1924-2001) - Professor of Accordion & Music Theory - University of Denver: Lamont School of Music
 Pietro Deiro (1888–1954) – pioneer of the accordion
 Vladimir Denissenkov (born 1956) – Russian Bayan
 Dennis DeYoung (born 1947) – American member of Styx, played on "Boat on the River"
 Orlando DiGirolamo (1924–1998), American
 Wolfgang Dimetrik (born 1974), Austrian
 Henry Doktorski (born 1956) – American classical and concert accordionist
 Dominguinhos (1941–2013) – Brazilian music
 Wilf Doyle (1925–2012) – traditional musician from Newfoundland
 Alejo Durán (1919–1989) – Colombian Vallenato accordionist, singer, composer
 Finbarr Dwyer (1946–2014) – Irish traditional musician

E
 Mogens Ellegaard (1935–1995) – father of the avant-garde accordion movement
 Jack Emblow (born 1930) – with Cliff Adams Singers
 Keith Emerson (1944–2016)
 John Evan (born 1948) – of Jethro Tull

F
 Joe Falcon (1900–1965) – Cajun accordion player who recorded with his wife Cléoma Breaux, mainly in French
 Jeff Fatt (born 1953) - member of The Wiggles
 James Fearnley (born 1954) – member of The Pogues
 Myron Floren (1919–2005)
 Connie Francis (born 1937)
 Dominic Frontiere (1931–2017)
 Pietro Frosini (1885–1951)

G
 Benny Gallagher (born 1945) – Scottish singer-songwriter; member of Gallagher and Lyle, McGuinness Flint and Ronnie Lane's Slim Chance
 Anthony Galla-Rini (1904–2006) – American accordionist, arranger, composer, conductor, author and teacher
 Richard Galliano (born 1950) – French jazz accordionist
Krency Garcia – Dominican merengue tipico accordionist, better known as El Prodigio
 Régis Gizavo (1959–2017) – accordionist from Madagascar
 Luiz Gonzaga (1912–1989) – the King of Baião
 Martin Green (born 1980) – English composer and accordionist, member of the folk trio Lau
 Josh Groban (born 1981) – learned the accordion to play the role of Pierre Bezukhov in the musical Natasha, Pierre & The Great Comet of 1812
 Michael Guerra (born 1981) – member of The Mavericks
 Alfredo Gutiérrez (born 1940) – Colombian Vallenato musician
Rachel Narzey Garner birth Escambia,Florida December 21,1942 til Haines City,Florida July 29,2022 instruments played accordion, piano and guitar.Tuned piano and guitar

H
 Frode Haltli (born 1975) – Norwegian accordionist
 Daniel Handler (born 1970), aka Lemony Snicket
 Rolf Harris (born 1930)
 Kevin Hearn (born 1969) – zydeco musician of Barenaked Ladies
 Tatico Henríquez (1943–1976) – Dominican Merengue típico accordionist
 Matt Hensley – of Flogging Molly
 Harry Hibbs (1942–1989) – Canadian musician
 David Hidalgo (born 1954) – member of Los Lobos
 Lars Hollmer (1948–2008) – Swedish accordionist
 Bruce Hornsby (born 1954)
 Nihad Hrustanbegovic (born 1973)
 Garth Hudson (born 1937) – member of The Band
 Rob Hyman (born 1950) – member of The Hooters

I
 Gary Innes (born 1980)

J
 Bengan Janson (born 1963) – Swedish jazz- and folk music player
 Ryan Jarman (born 1980) – member of The Cribs
 Jean-Michel Jarre (born 1948)
 Flaco Jiménez (born 1939)
 Santiago Jiménez Jr. (born 1944)
 Beau Jocque (1953–1999) – zydeco musician
 Billy Joel (born 1949)
 Pete Jolly (1932–2004) – American jazz pianist and accordionist
 Brian Jones (1942–1969) – member of The Rolling Stones
 Steve Jordan (1939–2010)
 Tyler Joseph (born 1988) – lead singer of Twenty One Pilots
 Kepa Junkera (born 1965) – Basque musician and composer

K
 Boris Karlov (1924–1964) – Bulgarian accordionist, born in Sofia into a Romani family. 
 James Keane (born 1948) – Irish traditional musician
 John Kirkpatrick (born 1947)
 Guy Klucevsek (born 1947) – American musician and composer
 Yasuhiro Kobayashi (born 1959)

L
 Gabby La La (born 1979)
 Lead Belly (1889–1949) – American folk and blues musician
 Don Lee (1930–2015) – musician who had the 1957 hit "ECHO, Echo echo"
 Yuri Lemeshev (born 1954) – member of Gogol Bordello
 John Linnell (born 1959) – member of They Might Be Giants
 Nils Lofgren (born 1951)
 Radoslav Lorković (born 1958) – Croatian pianist and accordionist
 Todd Lumley (born 1968)
 Ramon Ayala (born 1928)

M
 Charles Magnante (1905–1986) – pioneer of the accordion
 Frank Marocco (1931–2012) – jazz accordionist
 Mat Mathews (1924–2009) – Dutch jazz accordionist
 Bear McCreary (born 1979) – American film composer
 Loreena McKennitt (born 1957) – Canadian musician, composer, harpist, accordionist and pianist 
 Johnny Meijer (1912–1992) – Dutch jazz accordionist
Dionisio Mejia (1911–1978) – Dominican merengue tipico accordionist, better known as Guandulito
 Colacho Mendoza (1936–2003) – Colombian Vallenato accordionist
 Mestrinho (born 1988) Brazilian accordionist / singer
 Lisandro Meza (born 1937) – Colombian musician
 Andrew Micallef (born 1969) – Maltese chromatic button accordionist
 Alessandra Mignacca (born c.1977/78) – Italian accordion player, teacher
 Brian Mitchell – member of Fatboy Kanootch, Levon Helm Band
 Aniceto Molina (1939–2015) – Colombian musician

N
 Maria Ney (1890–1959/61) – German cabaret performer
Franz Nicolay (born 1977) – member of The World/Inferno Friendship Society
 Krist Novoselic (born 1965) – bassist in Nirvana

O
 Pauline Oliveros (1932–2016) – avant garde performer
 Walter Ostanek (born 1935)

P
 Nejc Pačnik (born 1990) – Slovenian accordionist, twice accordion world-champion and accordion teacher
 Esa Pakarinen (1911–1989) – Finnish accordionist and actor
 Willard A. "Bill" Palmer (1917–1996) – inventor of the quint system which was later patented by Titano as used in their line of "converter" (or "quint") bass accordions
 Zeena Parkins (born 1956) – American accordionist
 Van Dyke Parks (born 1943) – composer, arranger, and accordionist
 Don Peachey (born 1933) – American musician and recording artist
 Cory Pesaturo (born 1986) – eclectic accordionist
 Joseph Petric (born 1952) – Canadian concert accordionist
 Celso Piña (1953–2019) – cumbia musician
 Kimmo Pohjonen (born 1964) – experimental Finnish accordionist

R
 Matti Rantanen (born 1952) – classical accordionist
 Juancho Rois (1958–1994) – Colombian Vallenato musician
 Israel Romero (born 1954) – Colombian Vallenato musician
 Saul Rose (born 1973) – English melodeon player
 Roberto Ruscitti (born 1941) – Venezuelan accordionist

S
 Johnny Sansone (born 1957)
 William Schimmel (born 1946) – accordionist, composer and philosopher
 John Serry Sr. (1915-2003) – classical and concert accordionist, free-bass accordionist
 Alexander Sevastian (1976–2018) – Russian-Canadian classical, concert, and classical crossover accordionist
 Jimmy Shand (1908–2000) – Scottish accordionist, made famous by his unique Scottish Country Dance Band and popularity for dances.
 Sharon Shannon (born 1968) – Irish accordionist
 Sivuca (1930–2006) – Brazilian musician
 Chango Spasiuk (born 1968) – Argentine folk musician of Ukrainian descent
 John Spiers (born 1975) – English melodeon player
 Will Starr (1922–1976) – Scottish accordionist, technically a genius and a true master of the button key accordion, famous for his expertise at playing every genre of music.  Described as the true "Master of the Button Key Accordion"

T

 Natalia Tena (born 1984)
 Matt Thiessen (born 1980) – member of Relient K
 Yann Tiersen (born 1970) – French composer and multi-instrumentalist
 Aslan Tlebzu (born 1981) – Adyghe folk musician
 Lee Tomboulian (born 1960)
 Arthur Tracy (1899–1997) – American accordionist and ballad singer
 Karen Tweed (born 1963)

U
 Brendon Urie (born 1987) – member of Panic! at the Disco

V
 Kristín Anna Valtýsdóttir (born 1982)
 Art Van Damme (1920–2010)
 Tim Van Eyken (born 1978)
 Mika Väyrynen (born 1967)
 Eddie Vedder (born 1964) – member of Pearl Jam
 Aníbal Velásquez (born 1936) – Colombian Vallenato musician
 Julieta Venegas (born 1970)
 Travis Vengroff (born 1987) – member of Random Encounter
 Emir Vildić (born 1984) – Bosnian accordionist and accordion teacher
 Gus Viseur (1915–1974) – French accordionist

W
 Jason Webley (born 1974) – American musician
 Lawrence Welk (1903–1992)
 Martin White – British cover artist
 Minnie White (1916-2001) – Newfoundland's "First Lady of the Accordion"
 Wix Wickens (born 1956)
 Bill Wilkie (1922–2017)
 Dave Willey (born 1963)
 Patrick Wolf (born 1983)
 Richard Wright (1943–2008) – member of Pink Floyd

Y
 Frankie Yankovic (1915–1998) – polka musician
 "Weird Al" Yankovic (born 1959) – song parodist, comedian
 Max Yankowitz (1875–1945) - klezmer musician

Z
 Jimmy Zambrano (born 1966) – Colombian Vallenato accordionist
 Joe Zawinul (1932–2007)
 Vladislav Zolotaryov (1942–1975)
 Emiliano Zuleta (1912–2005) – Colombian Vallenato accordionist, composer

See also

List of banjo players
List of cellists
List of didgeridoo players
List of euphonium players
List of flautists
List of guitarists
List of harmonicists

References

Accordionists